The 4th Army Division is a unit of the Peruvian Army.

History
The unit was officially established by the Peruvian Joint Command as the VRAE Military Region on March 13, 2008. Its jurisdiction is limited to the Apurímac–Ene Valley Area, having been specifically created in order to deal with narcoterrorism and cocaine production in the area, where much of the drug trade is controlled by remants of the Shining Path guerrilla group. The unit acquired its current name in 2013.

In 2016, on the eve of that year's general election, the division's 311th Counterinsurgency Battalion, part of the 31st Infantry Brigade, was ambushed by Shining Path insurgents, leaving 11 dead and 5 wounded.

The unit's coat of arms features two crossed Galil rifles.

Organization
The 4th Army Division is formed by the following units:
2nd Infantry Brigade
31st Infantry Brigade
32nd Engineering Brigade
33rd Infantry Brigade

See also
1st Army Division
2nd Army Division
3rd Army Division
5th Army Division

References

Military units and formations of Peru